The  (abbreviated as DB or DB AG) is the national railway company of Germany. Headquartered in the Bahntower in Berlin, it is a joint-stock company (AG). The Federal Republic of Germany is its single shareholder.

 describes itself as the second-largest transport company in the world, after the German postal and logistics company  / DHL, and is the largest railway operator and infrastructure owner in Europe. Deutsche Bahn was the largest railway company in the world by revenue in 2015; in 2019, DB Passenger transport companies carried around 4.8 billion passengers, and DB logistics companies transported approximately 232 million tons of goods in rail freight transport.

The group is divided into several companies, including DB Fernverkehr (long-distance passenger), DB Regio (local passenger services) and DB Cargo (rail freight). The Group subsidiary DB Netz also operates large parts of the German railway infrastructure, making it the largest rail network in Europe.

The company generates about half of its total revenue from operating rail transport, with other half of the business comprising the further transport and logistics businesses, as well as various service providers. The company generates part of its revenue through public transport contracts and support services for infrastructure maintenance and expansion.

Company profile 
The Deutsche Bahn Group is divided into various organizational units that perform their tasks with subsidiaries.

Personenverkehr 
DB Personenverkehr is the group that manages passenger travel within Germany. Originally called  (English: Travel and Tourism), this group is responsible for the managing, servicing and running of German passenger services. This group is divided into three business areas: ,  and Arriva.

Arriva

Deutsche Bahn purchased Arriva in August 2010 off the London Stock Exchange. To satisfy the European Commission, Arriva's German operations were rebranded Netinera and sold. As at July 2022, Arriva operated 15,700 buses and 800 railway vehicles in 14 European countries. In 2019 Deutsche Bahn unsuccessfully tried to sell the business.

DB Fernverkehr 

 is a semi-independent division of  that operates long-distance passenger trains in Germany.

 operates all Intercity Express and Intercity trains in Germany as well as in some neighboring countries and several EuroCity and EuroCityExpress trains throughout Europe.

Additionally  operates a few long-distance coach services throughout Germany, called .

DB Regio 

 DB Regio AG is the subsidiary of  that operates passenger trains on short and medium distances in Germany. Unlike its long-distance counterpart, it does not operate trains on its own account.

 rail services are divided into several regional companies:

 for Schleswig-Holstein, Hamburg, Lower Saxony, Bremen
 for Berlin, Brandenburg, Mecklenburg-Vorpommern
 for North Rhine-Westphalia
 for Saxony, Saxony-Anhalt, Thuringia
 for Rhineland-Palatinate, Saarland, Hesse and parts of Baden-Württemberg
 for the rest of Baden-Württemberg
 for Bavaria

 (small, independent networks, like Erzgebirgsbahn, Gäubodenbahn, Kurhessenbahn, Oberweißbacher Bergbahn, Südostbayernbahn, Westfrankenbahn for easier organisation)

The bus services consist of 25 bus companies, which have subsidiary companies themselves.

Infrastructure

DB Netze 
The infrastructure division is divided into the DB Netz (rail infrastructure), DB Station&Service (stations and services) and DB Energie (Energy) business units.

DB Engineering & Consulting 
DB Engineering & Consulting, which is responsible for construction supervision, construction planning and maintenance, is also assigned to this department without being part of a business area.

Via its subsidiary DB Engineering&Consulting, DB signed a memorandum of understanding with Iranian rail operator Bonyad Eastern Railways (BonRail) in May 2017 and shortly after a consulting contract with Islamic Republic of Iran Railways; both projects were abandoned after the United States imposed new sanctions against Iran and said firms doing business with Iran would be barred from doing business with the United States.

The California High-Speed Rail Authority's (CHSRA) board approved on 15 November 2017 an early train operator contract with DB Engineering & Consulting USA. The firm is the U.S. arm of Deutsche Bahn AG. As early train operator, DB Engineering & Consulting will assist CHSRA with planning, designing and implementing the state's high-speed rail program.

In Germany, DB E&C acts as a planning office and in construction supervision for Deutsche Bahn construction sites.

Logistics 

The Transport and Logistics division acted in the market with the business units DB Schenker Logistics and DB Schenker Rail, which were combined under the umbrella of DB Schenker, and the Intermodal division, which operates in combined transport. In 2016, rail freight transport was separated from logistics and DB Schenker Rail was renamed DB Cargo.

In cooperation with the logistics provider time:matters, DB offers the transport of shipments weighing up to 20 kg on its EC/IC/ICE trains.

Foreign firms 
DB also has interests abroad, owning the United Kingdom's largest rail freight operator, DB Cargo UK, which also operates the British Royal Train and also has interests in Eastern Europe. It is possible to obtain train times for any journey in Europe from 's website.

Trans-Eurasia Logistics is a joint venture with Russian Railways (RŽD) that operates container freight trains between Germany and China via Russia.

Key persons

Management board 
 Richard Lutz (CEO Chairman of the management board) since 2017
 Levin Holle (Member of the management board for Finance and Logistics, CFO)
 Daniela Gerd tom Markotten (Member of the management board for Digitalization and Technology)
 Berthold Huber (Member of the management board for Infrastructure)
 Sigrid Nikutta (Member of the management board for Freight Transport)
 Martin Seiler (Member of the management board for Human Resources and Legal Affairs)
 Evelyn Palla (Member of the management board for Regional Transport)
 Michael Peterson (Member of the management board for Long Distance Passenger Transport)

Supervisory board 
 Michael Odenwald (chairman of the supervisory board)

History

Background: the Deutsche Reichsbahn 

The Deutsche Reichsbahn operated from 1920 through the Weimar and Nazi eras until 1949, when it was split between East and West Germany into two successor entities, Deutsche Reichsbahn and Deutsche Bundesbahn, respectively. They remained separate throughout the Cold War when there were two separate German states. The 1989 fall of the Berlin Wall, and German reunification in 1990, paved the way for the companies to reunite. At the same time,  adopted its current logo and DB abbreviation.   modernised the logo and typographer  designed a new corporate font known as DB Type. When Deutsche Bahn was formed in January 1994, it became a joint stock-company, and were designed to operate the railways of both the former East and West Germany after unification in October 1990 as a single, uniform, and private company. There are three main periods of development in this unified German railway: its formation, its early years (1994–1999), and the period from 1999 to the present.

However, these plans were put on hold due to the financial crisis of 2008, and the  lease was extended. Construction of the new headquarters building was started in 2017 under the title "Cube Berlin" according to the designs by 3XN. Finished in February 2020, the Cube will house the legal offices of Deutsche Bahn, but not become the main headquarters.

1999 to present 
All rolling stock, track, personnel, and real assets were divided between the subsidiaries of DBAG:  (long-distance passenger service, later renamed  (operating the stations)). This new organisational scheme was introduced not least to implement European Community directive 91/440/EEC that demands open access operations on railway lines by companies other than those that own the rail infrastructure.

In December 2007, DB reorganised again, bringing all passenger services into its  arm, logistics under  and infrastructure and operations under .

The DB is owned by the Federal Republic. By the Constitution, the Federal Republic is required to retain (directly or indirectly) a majority of the infrastructure (the present ) stocks.

In 2008, it was agreed to "float" a portion of the business, meaning an end to the 100% share the German Federal Republic had in it, with a plan that 25% of the overall share would be sold to the private sector. However the onset of the financial crisis of 2007–08 saw this cancelled.

In June 2018 controversy grew in the United Kingdom over widespread cancellations of railway services and numerous delayed services operated by Deutsche Bahn in Britain, under its Northern brand. This resulted in Britain's Minister of Transport, Chris Grayling, setting up an enquiry into whether the Deutsche Bahn subsidiary had breached its contractual agreement to provide railway services in the north of England. He warned that if the company was found to be in breach of its contractual agreements it could be banned from running railway services in the United Kingdom.

Logo

Structure and subsidiaries

DB Cargo

Train categories 
Trains in Germany are classified by their stopping pattern:
  (long-distance trains), also Fernzug
 ICE (Intercity-Express) for high-speed long-distance train services between major cities and regions. Certain routes also cross European borders into the Netherlands, Belgium, France, Switzerland and Austria.
EC (EuroCity) for intercity trains that cross borders, and connect Germany with other countries. Can also be operated by foreign State Railways.
 IC (InterCity) for long-distance semi-high-speed services that connect regions and cities. IC services are slightly lower in class than ICE services, with trains reaching lower speeds (average around 160 – 220 km/h), with more frequent stops. On some IC routes the trains use legacy railway lines instead of the high speed lines the ICE takes. International IC services are usually operated as EuroCity.
 Just as ICE, EC and (few) IC cross European borders, train categories of other operators cross into Germany and are operated in cooperation with Deutsche Bahn:
 ECE (EuroCity Express) for international high-speed rail services. Currently only one route from Frankfurt to Milan.
 TGV from France to Frankfurt and Munich via Stuttgart.
 RJ (Railjet) from Austria to Munich and Frankfurt as well as to Berlin.
  (local trains)
 IRE are longer distance RE trains that connect regions and cities. On most routes they serve as slower IC trains. IRE trains only exist in Baden-Württemberg and on the Hamburg–Berlin route.
 RE serve regions and connects cities, and do not stop at every station on the route.
 RB stop at all stations on the route (except where S-Bahn is available) and are often the most basic train service available.
 S is a type of rapid transit for larger cities and stop at all stations.  operate high-frequency services and are usually characterised by crossing through the city centre with dense station spacing.

Train categories no longer used include:
 MET (Metropolitan) was a luxury train service between Hamburg and Cologne. The two special MET train sets are now used for IC and ICE services, and does still have a comfort level above the regular IC and ICE coaches.
 IR, set between RE and IC was meant to connect cities and regions at a lower price, but also be used for local traffic. Replaced partly by IC, RE and IRE.
 SE operated as a mixture of RE and RB: trains skipped many stations in urban areas but made all stops in the countryside. Rebranded as RE and RB. In some regions, such as Rhine-Main (Frankfurt), the local transit authority advertised trains as SE. Internally, DB classified them as either RE or RB, but even DB trains display "SE" on their destination boards. This ceased in December 2016.

In the early days of DBAG, the most basic train categories, which were in use since the early days of rail travel in Germany, were also used:
It was replaced by IC and the even faster ICE. The trains of the  car shuttle service connecting the island of Sylt with the mainland are still officially referred to as D trains
 E was the semi-fast service offering faster journeys than normal passenger trains but not at such long distances and speed as D trains, though there were some quite long running E trains. No direct successor, would be located between RE and IC
 N, the most basic form of train service stopping at all stations.

There are several other operators in Germany which sometimes offer other categories, also, a local transport authority or tariff associations might brand the trains in a different way than DB does. For example, in the Nuremberg region, RE and RB trains are not differentiated, but called R instead. In online and print information systems of DB, private trains officially labelled RB and RE by their operators, might get a different label, for example "ABR" for trains operated by Abellio, though on platforms,  trains and maps or timetables issued by the local transport authority overseeing regional train services, these abbreviations usually do not appear.

Codeshare agreements 

Tickets 
DB offers two different pricing models for single or return tickets for routes that include long-distance trains:
 The Flexpreis (originally Normalpreis): gives full flexibility, i.e., all trains on the given date can be used on the chosen route. This price is independent of the time of purchase for a given route and tickets are reimbursable prior to the day of departure. 
 The Sparpreis and Super-Sparpreis are generally cheaper tickets that must be purchased in advance and are only valid for a specific connection. Supersparpreis prices for long-distance journeys start at €17.90 and Sparpreis at €21.90, but may climb close to the Flexpreis prices closer to departure and at busier dates and routes. Stopovers during travel are possible within a day and if the travel ends until 10:00 a.m. the next day, but then the long-distance trains to be used after the stopover must also be fixed in advance. Planned stopovers may sometimes help to circumvent times of day with higher occupancy and higher prices. Sparpreis tickets are partially reimbursible, but only against vouchers for the next travel.

Ticket prices generally rise degressively over distance, particularly for Sparpreise and Supersparpreise. Therefore, putting connecting local trains or excursions planned for the next morning on the same ticket is usually of advantage. Seat reservations are included only for first class tickets and seating capacity is not always assured, even for tickets valid on one particular connection only.
 
Local trains (S, RB, RE, IRE) also accept tickets issued by local transport associations, which can also be used on buses, trams, and U-Bahn trains.

DB offers concessionary fares with the BahnCard discount cards, which are available as BahnCard 25 (25% discount on Flexpreis and Sparpreis), BahnCard 50 (50% discount on Flexpreis and 25% discount on Sparpreis), and BahnCard 100 (unlimited travel on all Deutsche Bahn trains, a few private train companies and also in many local transport associations).

Other special tickets, such as the Länder-Tickets, which give unlimited journeys on local trains and in many transport associations within a state, and Interrail are also available. These Länder-Tickets offer group tickets, where up to five people can travel on a single ticket.

Regular travellers usually use weekly, monthly or annual passes for their connection or region; day or sometimes weekend passes exist in local transport primarily.

The price system applies to some international destinations from Germany similarly, when bought at Deutsche Bahn, but it is often advisable to compare prices of the respective train operators involved.

Incidents 
 Bad Aibling rail accident
 Brühl train derailment
 Eschede train disaster
 Garmisch-Partenkirchen train derailment
 Hordorf train collision
 2012 Stuttgart derailments

See also 

 
DB Cargo
 Rail transport in Germany
 Railway electrification system
 Transport in Germany

References

External links 

 
 DB Corporate Home Page
 DB travel portal

 
 
Berlin S-Bahn
Companies based in Berlin
German companies established in 1994
German brands
Government-owned companies of Germany
Railteam
Railway companies established in 1994
Government-owned railway companies
Star Alliance